Lufthavnen station (The Airport Station) is a rapid transit station of the Copenhagen Metro, located at Copenhagen Airport on the island of Amager. The station is the terminus of the M2 line and is located in fare zone 4.

Trains approach the station by a bridge over the Øresund Motorway (E20). The platform area is constructed above the tracks of the Øresund Line adjoining a multi-storey car park. The station connects to the airport at the north end of Terminal 3 on level 2.

External links 
 
 Lufthavnen Station on www.m.dk 
 Lufthavnen Station on www.m.dk 

M2 (Copenhagen Metro) stations
Railway stations opened in 2007
Airport railway stations in Denmark
Railway stations in Denmark opened in the 21st century

de:Bahnhof Københavns Lufthavn, Kastrup
nl:Station Københavns Lufthavn, Kastrup
pl:Københavns Lufthavn (stacja kolejowa)